The Vistula barbel (Barbus waleckii) is a disputed species of European freshwater fish in the cyprinid genus Barbus.

It is often included in B. cyclolepis. More recently, it has been hypothesized to be a natural hybrid that originated from a common barbel (B. barbus) female mating with a Carpathian barbel (B. carpathicus) male. Nevertheless, the populations do not seem to represent first-generation hybrids. It is recorded or suspected from Poland, Slovakia and Ukraine.

Footnotes 
 
 Barbus waleckii IUCN Red List v. 3.1, 2008

W
Freshwater fish of Europe
Fish described in 1970